California's 79th State Assembly district is one of 80 California State Assembly districts. It is currently represented by Democrat Akilah Weber of La Mesa, California, who was elected on April 6, 2021 following the resignation of Democrat Shirley Weber, who assumed the position of California Secretary of State.

District profile 
The district encompasses southeastern San Diego and its closest eastern suburbs. The ethnically and socioeconomically diverse district is a mix of urban and suburban areas, with density roughly proportional to the distance from Downtown San Diego.

San Diego County – 15.1%
 Bonita
 Chula Vista – 36.4%
 La Mesa
 Lemon Grove
 National City – 27.1%
 San Diego – 19.9%

Election results from statewide races

List of Assembly Members 
Due to redistricting, the 79th district has been moved around different parts of the state. The current iteration resulted from the 2011 redistricting by the California Citizens Redistricting Commission.

Election results 1992 - present

2021 (special)

2020

2018

2016

2014

2012

2010

2008

2006

2004

2002

2000

1998

1996

1994

1992

See also 
 California State Assembly
 California State Assembly districts
 Districts in California

References

External links 
 District map from the California Citizens Redistricting Commission

79
Government of San Diego County, California
Government of San Diego
East County (San Diego County)
South Bay (San Diego County)
Chula Vista, California
La Mesa, California
Lemon Grove, California
National City, California